Vicente Allanegui y Lusarreta (1868–1948) was an Aragonese priest and composer born in Calanda in the Spanish comarca of Bajo Aragón.

Works
1926: Marcha Palillera (in Epdlp)

Bibliography
 Allanegui y Lusarreta, Vicente, Apuntes históricos sobre la Historia de Calanda, Ayuntamiento de Calanda-Parroquia de la Esperanza-Instituto de Estudios Turolenses, 1998.

Spanish Roman Catholic priests
1868 births
1948 deaths
People from Calanda